Taipingqiao Subdistrict is a subdistrict located at the northern end of Fengtai District, Beijing, China. It shares border with Yangfangdian Subdistrict in the north, Guang'anmenwai and You'anmen Subdistricts in the east, Lugouqiao Subdistrict in the west, and has several exclaves inside of Lugouqiao Township. In 2020, it had a population of 74,275 residents.

The name Taipingqiao refers to a village in the region that predated the subdistrict.

History 
Since the establishment of People's Republic of China in 1949, the land of what would become Taipingqiao Subdistrict had remained part of Lugouqiao Subdistrict for decades. In 1988, the preparation for creating a new subdistrict was started, and the subdistrict was formally established in October 1989.

Administrative Division 
At the end of 2021, there are 21 subdivisions under Taipingqiao Subdistrict, including 17 communities and 4 villages:

Landmark 

 Lotus Pond Park

See also 

 List of township-level divisions of Beijing

References 

Fengtai District
Subdistricts of Beijing